Rick France (born 12 July 1938) is a former international speedway rider from England.

Speedway career 
France reached the final of the Speedway World Championship in the 1967 Individual Speedway World Championship.

He rode in the top tier of British Speedway from 1960 to 1975, riding primarily for Coventry Bees. He was capped by England once and Great Britain four times.

World final appearances

Individual World Championship
 1967 –  London, Wembley Stadium – 12th – 5pts

References 

1938 births
British speedway riders
Coventry Bees riders
Halifax Dukes riders
Leicester Hunters riders
Middlesbrough Bears riders
Sheffield Tigers riders
Wolverhampton Wolves riders
Living people